On the Sunny Side is a 1942 drama film, directed by Harold D. Schuster, starring Roddy McDowall, Jane Darwell and Stanley Clements.

Plot summary

Hugh Aylesworth (Roddy McDowall), is a well-bred English youth who is evacuated to America during the London Blitz. Hugh moves into the home of Mr. and Mrs. Andrews (Don Douglas and Katherine Alexander). The couple's own son Don (Freddie Mercer), feels neglected and considers Hugh a royal pain in the posterior.

Cast
 Roddy McDowall as Hugh Aylesworth
 Jane Darwell as Annie
 Stanley Clements as Tom Sanders
 Katharine Alexander as Mrs. Mary Andrews
 Donald Douglas as Mr. Andrews (as Don Douglas)
 Freddie Mercer as Don Andrews
 Ann E. Todd as Betty (as Ann Todd)
 Jill Esmond as Mrs. Aylesworth
 Fred Walburn as Dick
 Leon Tyler as Flip
 William 'Billy' Benedict as Messenger
 Stuart Robertson as Broadcast Announcer

References

External links
 
 
 
 

1942 films
1940s war drama films
20th Century Fox films
American black-and-white films
American war drama films
1940s English-language films
Films based on short fiction
Films directed by Harold D. Schuster
Films scored by David Raksin
Films scored by Leigh Harline
Films set in Ohio
Films set on the home front during World War II
World War II films made in wartime
1942 drama films